are a Japanese three-piece rock band. Formed in 1986 by college students based in Tokyo, they have 11 original albums and continue to tour Japan. They once left the music scene but returned in July 2002 after a five-year absence. The current members are:

Haru (Haruyuki Oki), (Lead vocals & Bass)
Abi san (Yoshikazu Abiko), (Guitar)
Shin chan (Shinichiro Sato), (Drums)

Recently they participated in a tribute album for another Japanese rock band the pillows, with which they have strong ties.  They played one song from the pillows' second album 90's My Life. They played the pillows' Pari no Josei Mary in the tribute album, Synchronized Rockers.

Their latest drummer, who is touring with them for summer of 2005, is Sato Shinichirou, none other than the drummer for the pillows. He has been drumming with them for the past few years as a side project.

Discography
 Main albums

 Best albums
Butchie Mary 1989‐1997 Selection Side A, 1991
Butchie Mary 1989‐1997 Selection Side B, 1991	

Others
O.P.King, July 30, 2003
Synchronized Rockers, September 9, 2004

External links 
(Japanese) Official Site

Japanese rock music groups
Japanese musical trios
Musical groups from Tokyo